Megachile insignis is a species of bee in the family Megachilidae. It was described by van der Zanden in 1996.

References

Insignis
Insects described in 1996